Varronia polycephala, synonym Cordia polycephala, is a native plant of the Virgin Islands that is commonly found in open distributed areas. The flowers are sessile and the inflorescences are simple or branched. Fruits are usually bright red and 3-4 millimeters in diameter, covered by an enlarged calyx.

Usage 
The stems are known to be gathered from its habitat, which are marsh forests along creeks and rivers near the coast, and used as tooth cleaners. The fruits are known to be edible and they consist of a layer of pulpy, sweetish flesh surrounding a single seed.

Common name 
Varronia polycephala is also known as black-sage.

Distribution 
Varronia polycephala has a distribution in tropical forests of the Americas. It is native to Haiti, the Dominican Republic, Puerto Rico, the Virgin Islands, the Lesser Antilles, Colombia, Venezuela, Guyana, Suriname, Ecuador, Peru, Brazil, Bolivia, Paraguay and Argentina.

Conservation 
This species can be found in protected areas throughout its range of the Lesser Antilles and South America. In Puerto Rico it is found in public forests, such as Maricao, Ro Abajo, and Cambalache. It is also found in the Virgin Islands National Park and Sage Mountain National Park on the island of Tortola.

References 

 Acevedo-Rodríguez, P., & Angell, B. (2005). Flora of St. John. Bronx, NY: The New York Botanical Garden.

Boraginaceae